The Château du Pflixbourg (from the German Blicksburg = “castle with a view”) is a castle in the commune of Wintzenheim, in the Haut-Rhin département of France.

The castle has been listed as a Monument historique since 1968 by the French Ministry of Culture.

See also
List of castles in France

References

Ruined castles in Haut-Rhin
Imperial castles